Ridin' for Justice is a 1932 American Pre-Code Western film directed by D. Ross Lederman and starring Buck Jones, Mary Doran, and Russell Simpson.

Plot
Buck Randall (Buck Jones), a carefree cowboy whose popularity with the local saloon girls becomes the talk of the town. The new marshal, Joseph Slyde (Russell Simpson), gets on Buck's bad side by enforcing a "no gun" rule. Buck returns the favor by falling in love with the marshal's mistreated wife, Mary (Mary Doran), and she asks her husband for a divorce so she can marry Buck.

Cast
 Buck Jones as Buck Randall
 Mary Doran as Mary Slyde
 Russell Simpson as Marshal Joseph Slyde
 Walter Miller as Deputy Alex Frame
 Robert McKenzie as Judge Septimus P. Spear (as Bob McKanzie)
 Will Walling as Ranch Boss Tom Wilson (as William Walling)
 Billy Engle as Sam - the Stutterer
 Hank Mann as Pete - The Drunk

References

External links
 
 
 
 

1932 films
1932 Western (genre) films
American Western (genre) films
American black-and-white films
Columbia Pictures films
1930s English-language films
Films directed by D. Ross Lederman
1930s American films